"Stunnin'" is a song by Canadian-American musician Curtis Waters, released on May 19, 2020 as his debut single. The song features Canadian musician Harm Franklin and was produced by Decz. The official music video was directed and edited by Ryan Tempke. It went viral on the video-sharing app TikTok, becoming the breakthrough hit of both artists.

Background
While a student in UNC Greensboro and working at Tropical Smoothie Cafe, Curtis Waters studied the promotion methods of viral hits on TikTok, such as that of Lil Nas X's "Old Town Road" and The BoyBoy West Coast's "U Was at the Club". He has explained that he recorded "Stunnin'" because "I was just in a bad mood, trying to make some stupid shit and cheer up."

Release and promotion
In early April 2020, Waters uploaded his first video on TikTok, of him and his brother dancing to the song in front of their garage. He continued to post similar clips featuring the song, propelling it to recognition. The success of the song led to Waters receiving many record deals, including one with BMG Rights Management which he settled for. "Stunnin'" was released to streaming services in May 2020. By February 2023, the song had amassed over 285 million streams on Spotify.

Charts

Certifications

References

2020 debut singles
2020 songs
Pop-rap songs